Batyr Hajyýewiç Babaýew (born August 21, 1991) is a Turkmen footballer, who plays as a goalkeeper for Nebitçi FC and the Turkmenistan national team.

Club career 
In recent years he has been playing for the FC Ahal.

On 2021, he signed a contract with Nebitçi Balkanabat.

International career 
He made his debut for the Turkmenistan national team during friendly match against Kuwait in October 2019. He was included in Turkmenistan's squad for the 2019 AFC Asian Cup in the United Arab Emirates.

References

External links 
 

1991 births
Living people
People from Balkan Region
Turkmenistan footballers
Association football defenders
Turkmenistan international footballers
FC Ahal players
2019 AFC Asian Cup players